Steven Noel Blair (born July 4, 1939) is an American exercise scientist. He has been a tenured professor in the Department of Exercise Science and Epidemiology and Biostatistics in the University of South Carolina's Arnold School of Public Health since 2006. He previously worked at the Dallas, Texas-based Cooper Institute, of which he was president and CEO from 2002 to 2006. He is known for his research on the health benefits of physical exercise. A 2005 New York Times article described Blair as "one of the nation's leading experts on the health benefits of exercise".

Awards and degrees
Blair's awards include the American Heart Association's Population Science Research Prize, the President's Council on Sports, Fitness, and Nutrition Lifetime Achievement Award, and the Bloomberg Manulife Prize from McGill University. He is also a fellow of the American Epidemiological Society, the American Heart Association, the American College of Sports Medicine, the National Academy of Kinesiology, the Society of Behavioral Medicine, and the Obesity Society. He has served as president of the American College of Sports Medicine, the American Academy of Kinesiology and Physical Education, and the National Coalition for Promoting Physical Activity. He holds three honorary degrees: a Doctor Honoris Causa degree from the Free University of Brussels, a Doctor of Health Science degree from Lander University, and a Doctor of Science Honoris Causa degree from the University of Bristol.

Funding by the soft drink industry
In 2015, Blair came under scrutiny after the New York Times reported that he had received $3.5 million in research grants from the Coca-Cola Company since 2008. $500,000 of this money was used by Blair to help establish the Global Energy Balance Network (GEBN), a non-profit organization which was criticized for attempting to downplay the contribution of soft drink consumption to obesity. The University of South Carolina refused to return the grant, with a university spokesperson saying that the research funded by the grant was "...conducted ethically and within all applicable guidelines". Blair insisted that Coca-Cola had no influence over the GEBN's work or messaging.

References

External links
Faculty page

1939 births
Living people
Exercise physiologists
American exercise and fitness writers
University of South Carolina faculty
People from Mankato, Kansas
Kansas Wesleyan University alumni
Indiana University Bloomington alumni
Sports scientists